A specification tree shows all specifications of a technical system under development in a hierarchical order.

For a spacecraft system it has the following levels:
 System (requirements) specification - generated by customer
 System (design to) specification - generated by system responsible prime contractor
 Subsystem specifications - generated by system responsible prime contractor
 Assembly specifications - generated by subsystem responsible contractors
 Unit specifications - generated by subsystem (or assembly) responsible contractors.

References

Product development
Systems engineering